The men's 85 kilograms event at the 2010 Asian Games took place on 17 November 2010 at Dongguan Arena.

Schedule
All times are China Standard Time (UTC+08:00)

Records 

 Andrei Rybakou's world record was rescinded in 2016.

Results 
Legend
NM — No mark

References
Results at iwf.net

External links 
 Results 

Weightlifting at the 2010 Asian Games